Stephen Hayes (1860 – 15 September 1929) was an Irish hurler. He played with club side Blackrock and at inter-county level with Cork. Hayes captained Cork to a third All-Ireland victory in-a-row in 1894.

Career

Hayes had his first hurling success when the Blackrock Nationals club won the inaugural Cork County Hurling Championship in 1887. It was the first of five such victories in seven seasons, with Hayes captaining the team in 1891 and 1894.

Hayes first played for Cork when he captained the team for the 1899 Munster Championship. He captained the team for a second time during Cork's unsuccessful 1891 campaign. Hayes returned for a third stint as captain when Cork beat Tipperary by 3-04 to 1-02 to win the Munster Championshi in 1894. He later captained the team to a 5-20 to 2-00 defeat of Dublin in the 1894 All-Ireland final, in what was a record third successive title for Cork. A dispute with the GAA resulted in Cork withdrawing from the 1895 All-Ireland Championship, a move which brought Hayes's inter-county activity to a close and ended the possibility of the team winning a fourth successive title.

Personal life and death

Hayes was born in Carrigtwohill, County Cork, but later settled in Blackrock where he worked as a steamship fireman. He married Mary Cotter in 1886 and the couple had ten children, seven of whom survived infancy.

Hayes died at the Cork District Hospital on 15 September 1929, at the age of 69.

Honours

Blackrock
Cork Senior Hurling Championship: 1887, 1889, 1891 (c), 1893, 1894 (c) 

Cork
All-Ireland Senior Hurling Championship: 1894 (c)
Munster Senior Hurling Championship: 1894 (c)

References

1860 births
1929 deaths
Blackrock National Hurling Club hurlers
Cork inter-county hurlers
All-Ireland Senior Hurling Championship winners